Grand Rapids Charter Township is a charter township of Kent County in the U.S. state of Michigan. The population was 16,661 at the 2010 census.

The township is bordered by Grand Rapids to the west and East Grand Rapids to the southwest, but the township is administered autonomously.

Communities
 Northview is an unincorporated community and census-designated place (CDP) with a very small portion located within Grand Rapids Township.  The majority of the CDP is to the north in Plainfield Township.

History
The township was first organized in 1834 under the name Kent Township.  The village of Grand Rapids was within the township, and the state renamed the township as Grand Rapids Township in 1842.  The village incorporated as an autonomous city from portions of the township in 1850.  Grand Rapids Township became a charter township in 1979.

Geography

Major highways
 runs diagonally to the northwest through portions of the township. 
 runs east–west though the southern portion of the township.
 runs south–north through the center of the township.

Demographics
As of the census of 2000, there were 14,056 people, 4,852 households, and 3,779 families residing in the township. The racial makeup of the township was 95.80% White, 0.99% African American, 0.18% Native American, 1.44% Asian, 0.01% Pacific Islander, 0.53% from other races, and 1.05% from two or more races. Hispanic or Latino of any race were 1.30% of the population.

There were 4,852 households, out of which 40.3% had children under the age of 18 living with them, 70.4% were married couples living together, 6.0% had a female householder with no husband present, and 22.1% were non-families. 19.8% of all households were made up of individuals, and 11.7% had someone living alone who was 65 years of age or older.  The average household size was 2.78 and the average family size was 3.22.

In the township the population was spread out, with 29.0% under the age of 18, 6.0% from 18 to 24, 24.9% from 25 to 44, 24.7% from 45 to 64, and 15.4% who were 65 years of age or older.  The median age was 40 years. For every 100 females, there were 91.0 males.  For every 100 females age 18 and over, there were 86.4 males.

The median income for a household in the township was $66,250, and the median income for a family was $76,021. Males had a median income of $52,135 versus $36,011 for females. The per capita income for the township was $30,531.  About 2.6% of families and 3.2% of the population were below the poverty line, including 3.4% of those under age 18 and 4.1% of those age 65 or over.

References

External links
Grand Rapids Township official website

Townships in Kent County, Michigan
Charter townships in Michigan
Grand Rapids metropolitan area
Populated places established in 1834
1834 establishments in Michigan Territory